Heiman is a surname. Notable people with the surname include:

Adolphus Heiman (1809–1862), Prussian-born American architect
Daniel Heiman, musician
Jesse Heiman (born 1978), American actor
Julia Heiman, American sexologist and psychologist
Levi Heimans (born 1985), Dutch track cyclist
Louise Henry (actress) (born Jessie Louise Heiman, 1911–1967), American film actress
Michal Heiman (born 1954), Israeli artist
Nachum Heiman, composer of songs and musics of films
Shlomo Heiman (1892–1945), Rabbi
Susan Heiman, a Miss Missouri
Walter Heiman (1901–2007), one of the last surviving veteran of the First World War

See also
 Chayyim, the basis for this name and similar spellings
 Heiman Dullaart (1636–1684), Dutch painter and poet
 Heimans
 Heyman
 Heymann
 Heymans
 Hijmans
 Haiman
 Hyman